Sailin' Shoes is the second studio album by the American rock band Little Feat, released in 1972. Produced by Ted Templeman, it marked a shift away from the sound of the band's eponymous debut, to that of their subsequent album, Dixie Chicken. It also introduced the cover artwork of Neon Park to the group, and was the last album appearance of original bassist Roy Estrada.

Music and recording
The music of Sailin' Shoes is a mixture of pop, rock, blues and country. Highlighted by a reworked group version of "Willin'", the album also featured such enduring tracks as "A Apolitical Blues," "Easy to Slip" and the title track, all by guitarist and lead vocalist Lowell George, the second co-written with Martin Kibbee, credited as "Fred Martin", a former band-mate from The Factory, and the first appearance of the "George/Martin" credit on a Little Feat record. The track "Texas Rose Cafe" is a tribute to a post-Houston concert visit by Lowell George and others to the hippie restaurant/club/beer garden. During refreshments upstairs George had said that he liked the place so much that he was going to write a song about it and it would be on their next album. It turned out to be true and not just so much "beer talk".

It was the last full Little Feat record to be produced by an outsider, until 1977's Time Loves a Hero, with each of the three interim albums being produced almost entirely by Lowell George. Noted Los Angeles-based session percussionist Milt Holland played percussion on "Easy to Slip" and "Trouble" and he also played tabla on the follow-up album Dixie Chicken. Ron Elliott of the Beau Brummels played rhythm guitar on "A Apolitical Blues" and Debbie Lindsey provided the female vocals on "Cold, Cold, Cold" and the title track.

Artwork
With his design for a "sailing shoe" of a cake swinging on a tree swing, the album's front cover by Neon Park seems to be an allusion to The Swing by painter Jean-Honoré Fragonard. Park himself said of the cover: "The Sailin' Shoes cover was inspired by Louis XIV. I'd just seen Rossellini's film about Louis XIV. And it seemed to relate a lot to Hollywood. A situation ruled by someone who kept everybody under his thumb by keeping them in hock from buying fancy clothes seemed to relate to Hollywood somehow. Actually, the only thing that was missing was the Hollywood sign, which I was going to put in the background. I thought that would be gauche. But I had a chance to pick up on that later with The Last Record Album.” The cover design also includes a giant snail and Mick Jagger dressed as Gainsborough's The Blue Boy as Park had been inspired by the film Performance.

Reception
It was voted number 469 in the third edition of Colin Larkin's All Time Top 1000 Albums (2000). In 2008 the album was released as Gold CD by Mobile Fidelity Sound Lab.

Record World said that "Easy to Slip" "features passionate vocal harmonies and one of the finest rhythm sections that ever rocked."

Cover versions
"Willin'" has been covered numerous times by various artists.
In 1972 Van Dyke Parks covered "Sailin' Shoes" on his album Discover America.
In 1973, the Scottish hard rock band Nazareth covered "Teenage Nervous Breakdown" on their album Loud 'n' Proud.
In 1974, backed by The Meters and Lowell George, Robert Palmer covered "Sailin' Shoes" on his debut solo album Sneakin' Sally Through the Alley.
In 1975, Robert Palmer covered "Trouble" on his album Pressure Drop.
In 1977, Bob Weir covered "Easy to Slip" on his solo release Heaven Help the Fool.
In 1988, Van Halen recorded a cover of "A Apolitical Blues" on their album, OU812, although the song is not included on cassette and vinyl copies of the album.
In 2022, The Black Crowes recorded a cover of "Easy To Slip" on their covers EP, 1972.

Track listing
All tracks written and sung by Lowell George, except where noted.

Side One
"Easy to Slip" (Lowell George, Fred Martin) – 3:22
"Cold, Cold, Cold" – 4:01
"Trouble" – 2:19
"Tripe Face Boogie" (Richie Hayward, Bill Payne) – 3:16
"Willin'" – 2:57
"A Apolitical Blues" – 3:28

Side Two
"Sailin' Shoes" – 2:53
"Teenage Nervous Breakdown" – 2:13
"Got No Shadow" (Payne) – 5:08
"Cat Fever" (Payne) – 4:37 (lead singer: Bill Payne)
"Texas Rose Café" – 3:42

Personnel 
Little Feat
Lowell George - guitar, lead (all but "Cat Fever") and backing vocals, harmonica, baritone saxophone, drum machine
Bill Payne - Hammond organ, backing and lead vocals ("Cat Fever"), Wurlitzer electric piano, piano, accordion
Roy Estrada - bass, backing vocals
Richie Hayward - drums, backing vocals, percussion

Additional
Milt Holland - percussion on "Easy to Slip" and "Trouble"
Sneaky Pete Kleinow - pedal steel guitar on "Willin'" and "Texas Rose Café"
Debbie Lindsey - backing vocals on "Cold Cold Cold" and "Sailin' Shoes"
Ron Elliott - rhythm guitar on "A Apolitical Blues"

References

1972 albums
Little Feat albums
Albums produced by Ted Templeman
Warner Records albums
Albums with cover art by Neon Park
Albums recorded at Sunset Sound Recorders